Pay Gadar (also Romanized as Pāy Gadār) is a village in Kakhk Rural District, Kakhk District, Gonabad County, Razavi Khorasan Province, Iran. At the 2006 census, its population was 46, in 12 families.

References 

Populated places in Gonabad County